Gary Sinise is an actor of the stage and screen

Over his career he has earned various awards for his performances in film, television and theatre. This includes a Golden Globe Award, three Screen Actors Guild Awards, a Primetime Emmy Award and a Tony Award. He was nominated for the Academy Award for his role in Forrest Gump (1994).

Sinise first starred in the film adaptation of John Steinbeck's classic novel Of Mice and Men which he also directed and produced. He is perhaps most known for his role as Lieutenant Dan Taylor in the Robert Zemeckis film Forrest Gump (1994) opposite Tom Hanks, for which he was nominated for the Academy Award for Best Supporting Actor. He continued acting opposite Hanks in Ron Howard's Apollo 13 (1995), and Frank Darabont's The Green Mile (1999). He earned Primetime Emmy Award nominations for his performances as Harry S. Truman in Truman (1995), and the title role in the television film George Wallace. On stage he has earned four Tony Award nominations including for his performances in The Grapes of Wrath and One Flew Over the Cuckoo's Nest. He earned the Tony Award's Regional Theatre Award alongside the Steppenwolf Theatre Company.

Sinise is known as a supporter of various veterans' organizations and founded the Lt. Dan Band (named after his character in Forrest Gump), which plays at military bases around the world. For his humanitarian work and work with veterans he has earned numerous awards including the Presidential Citizens Medal by President George W. Bushin 2008, The Kennedy Center Award for the Human Spirit in 2018, the American Spirit Award from The National WWII Museum and The Congressional Medal of Honor Society Patriot Award in 2020.

Major associations

Academy Awards

Golden Globe Awards

Screen Actors Guild Awards

Primetime Emmy Awards

Tony Awards

Honorary awards 
Over the years, Sinise has received numerous honors for his humanitarian work and his work on behalf of military veterans and families.   
2007 - the Bob Hope Award for Excellence in Entertainment 
2008 - the Presidential Citizens Medal by President George W. Bush.
2008 - Ellis Island Medal of Honor from the National Ethnic Coalition
2008 - Honorary Doctorate of Fine Arts	from Cal State Stanislaus
2009 - Spirit of the USO Award	from the USO
2012 - Boy Scouts of America Leader of the Year	
2012 - United States Navy, Honorary Chief Petty Officer
2012 - Spirit of Hope Award from Department of Defense
2013 - Civic Statesmanship Award	
2013 - Honorary Marine
2015 - United States Military Academy, Thayer Award
2016 - FDNY, Honorary Battalion Chief
2017 - James Cardinal Gibbons Medal from The Catholic University of America 
2018 - The Kennedy Center Award for the Human Spirit (Citizen Artist)	
2018 - American Spirit Award from The National WWII Museum
2018 - Grand Marshal, Rose Bowl Game, Honorary
2019 - The Eisenhower Award from Business Executives for National Security
2019 - Marine Corps League Honorary Membership	
2020 - United States Naval Academy, Honorary Graduate
2020 - The Congressional Medal of Honor Society Patriot Award

Theatre awards

Drama Desk Awards

Obie Awards

Outer Critics Circle Awards

Miscellaneous awards

Chicago Film Critics Association

Dallas-Fort Worth Film Critics

National Board of Review

Saturn Awards

Satellite Awards

Location Managers Guild Awards

References 

Sinise, Gary